BTS World: Original Soundtrack is the soundtrack album for the Netmarble mobile game of the same name. Released on June 28, 2019, two days after the mobile game's release, the album features four singles by South Korean boy band BTS and instrumentals from the game. Its release was preceded by the singles "Dream Glow" (a collaboration with British singer Charli XCX), "A Brand New Day" (a collaboration with Swedish singer Zara Larsson) and "All Night" (a collaboration with American rapper and singer Juice Wrld). On June 26, the song "Heartbeat" was revealed in the game after its release. The album debuted atop the Gaon Album Chart and their first #1 in Spain. Also, it became the first K-pop soundtrack to debut on the Billboard Top Soundtracks chart.

Background and release
An original soundtrack featuring new music from BTS for the group's then upcoming BTS World mobile game was first announced on June 4, 2019 (in South Korea, June 5 elsewhere). An unnamed-at-the-time sub-unit song by members Jin, Jimin, and Jungkook, would precede the soundtrack's release on June 7.

On June 10, 2019, links to various Korean e-commerce sites where physical editions of the soundtrack could be pre-ordered were shared via the group's company Twitter account. A subsequent link for global purchasing via Weply was shared from the platform's official Twitter account. Album pre-orders began that same day.

On June 27, it was revealed that the official album would have a total of 14 songs, including the three main singles, background music, and 7 solo "theme" songs. It was also revealed that there would be a music video released with the single "Heartbeat", which is the lead track on the album.

Singles
Three singles preceded the album's release. The first single "Dream Glow", a collaboration with British singer Charli XCX, was released on June 7, 2019. The second single, "A Brand New Day" with Swedish singer Zara Larsson, was released on June 14. The third single, "All Night" with American rapper Juice Wrld, was released on June 21.

A fourth single, "Heartbeat", was initially released in-game on June 26, and then globally on June 28 when digital and physical versions of the album became available. An accompanying music video, featuring concert footage of the group and scenes from the game, was simultaneously released with the track.

Track listing
All tracks produced by Kang Minkook, except where noted.

Charts

Weekly charts

Monthly charts

Year-end charts

Certifications

Notes

References

2019 soundtrack albums
BTS albums
Albums produced by Stargate
Albums produced by Mura Masa
Kakao M albums
Kakao M soundtracks
Hybe Corporation albums